The Anchor is a student newspaper at Rhode Island College, established in 1928. It is student-run and published weekly during the academic year. Editorial decisions are made by a majority vote of its student editorial board.

As of September 2021, articles are posted online weekly on Monday, with a print edition published once a month.

Notable alumni
 Al Gomes, music producer and songwriter
 Danny Smith, executive producer (Family Guy)

References 

Publications established in 1928
Student newspapers published in Rhode Island